Pikeville may refer to:

 Pikeville, Alabama (disambiguation)
 Pikeville, Indiana
 Pikeville, Kentucky
 Pikeville, North Carolina
 Pikeville, Ohio
 Pikeville, Tennessee
 University of Pikeville, in Pikeville, Kentucky

See also 
 Pikesville, Maryland